Béroul was a Norman or Breton poet of the 12th century. He wrote Tristan, a Norman language version of the legend of Tristan and Iseult of which a certain number of fragments (approximately 3000 verses) have been preserved; it is the earliest representation of the so-called "vulgar" version of the legend (the "courtly" version being represented by fragments from Thomas of Britain's poem). Eilhart von Oberge wrote a treatment of this version in German, and many of Béroul's episodes that do not appear in Thomas reappear in the Prose Tristan. Beroul's poem survives in a single manuscript now in the Bibliothèque Nationale in Paris. This copy is poorly written  and there is a suggestion that part of the poem was written by a different scribe from the rest. The actual content of the poem also differs from the modern conception of what a narrative poem should be; the plot is disjointed and lacking in a flow of cause and effect, and the characters are poorly defined. Nevertheless, Fedrick proposes that this was common of literature in Beroul's time.

See also
  Anglo-Norman literature

References

External links
  
 Texte of Tristan
 Chapter Béroul in Pinkernell: "Namen, Titel und Daten der französischen Literatur"

Writers of Arthurian literature
Norman-language poets
12th-century Normans
12th-century French writers
12th-century French poets
French male poets
Tristan and Iseult